The Premier’s Climate Change Council was established by the Government of South Australia under the Climate Change and Greenhouse Emissions Reduction Act 2007. The Council provides independent advice to the Minister responsible for Climate Change about matters related to the reduction of greenhouse gas emissions and climate change adaptation and was formed in 2008 during the Rann Government. The Council's membership represents the business community, the environment and conservation sector, the scientific community and state and local governments. It is chaired by prominent South Australian businessman Martin Haese, who was appointed to the role in 2019.

In 2019 the Council supported the development of the Blue Carbon Strategy for South Australia,. to help mitigate climate change by protecting the state's blue carbon sinks, including seagrass meadows, saltmarshes and mangroves.

The Council also supported the development of the South Australian Government Climate Change Action Plan 2021-2025, which was released in December 2020.

In 2013, Michelle Lensink MLC questioned the efficacy of the Premier's Climate Change Council, and asked the Minister for the environment, Ian Hunter about the absence of the Council's 2011-12 annual report from the Council's website. In 2013, the Council published South Australia’s Climate Change Vision: Pathways to 2050 to advise Premier Jay Weatherill and his government on future planning and policy directions for the state.

Role
The role of the council is to “provide independent advice to the Minister about matters associated with reducing greenhouse gas emissions and adapting to climate change. The Council also takes a leadership role in consulting with and disseminating information to sectors of the community about issues associated with climate change.”

Membership

Selection criteria
The Act requires the appointment of seven to ten persons by the Minister from state and local government, the business community, the environment and conservation sector, the scientific community, and from other sectors of the South Australian community.  The appointment process must take account of: an individual person’s knowledge of and expertise in the subject matter; consultation with the Local Government Association of South Australia and the Conservation Council of South Australia; and must ensure the minimal representation of both genders.

Membership as of 2022

As of 2022, the Council's membership includes: 
 Martin Haese (Chair) 
 Daniel Bennett 
 Daniel Conley (the Council's youth member)
 Susan Jeanes
 Penny Schulz
 Professor Richard Turner
 Lord Mayor Sandy Verschoor
 Craig Wilkins

Former members 
Professor Barry Brook 
 Kathryn Bellette
 Professor Don Bursill 
 Bruce Carter 
 Rob Chapman
 Dianne "Di" Davidson 
 Ros DeGaris
 Michelle Edge
 Mayor Ann Ferguson
 Brian Foster
 Dr Campbell Gemmell 
 Nicole Halsey
 Fred Hansen 
 Dr Paul Heithersay
 Allan Holmes 
 Tim Kelly 
 John Kerr 
 David Klingberg (Chair) 
 Dr Prue McMichael 
 Caroline McMillen 
 Suzanne Miller 
 John O'Brien
 Professor Mary O’Kane
 Tim O’Loughlin
 Professor Jean Palutikof
 Jenny Paradiso
 Pauline Peel 
 Julie Pettett 
 Sandy Pitcher
 Don Russell
 Verity Sanders 
 Joseph Scales
 Professor Andrew Stock
 Vienna Tran
 Michelle Tucker
 Jim White
 Cecilia Woolford

External links 
 Premier's Climate Change Council

References 

Climate change policy
Environment of South Australia
Advisory boards of the Government of South Australia
Climate change in Australia